Julia Bullock is an American soprano originally from St. Louis, Missouri. Anthony Tommasini from The New York Times has called her an "impressive, fast-rising soprano... poised for a significant career”.

Education
Born in 1987, Bullock joined Opera Theatre of Saint Louis's artist-in-training program while still in high school. She graduated with the prestigious Marielle Hubner Award. She received her bachelor's degree from the Eastman School of Music and her master's from Bard College's graduate vocal-arts program, where she worked with Dawn Upshaw. She went on to complete an artist diploma program at Juilliard in 2015. She holds the Lindemann Vocal Chair with Young Concert Artists, and also is supported by the Barbara Forester Austin Fund for Art Song.

She cites Nina Simone and Billie Holiday as early influences.

Career 
In 2013, when she was still at Juilliard, Bullock performed with Michael Tilson Thomas and the San Francisco Symphony. She met composer John Adams, who has called her his "muse," in 2014. Bullock sang the role of Dame Shirley in San Francisco Opera's 2017 world premiere of Adams's opera Girls of the Golden West. She also premiered the role in the European debut of the opera, at the Dutch National Opera, in Amsterdam.  In 2018, she starred as Kitty Oppenheimer in Adams's Doctor Atomic for Santa Fe Opera.

She served as the 2018-2019 Metropolitan Museum of Art's performance series Artist in Residence. While there, she and percussionist Tyshawn Sorey performed Perle Noire: Meditations for Joséphine, a tribute to Black jazz artist Josephine Baker. They previously performed the piece in 2016 as part of Cal Performances. The piece is set to make its European debut at the Dutch National Opera's Opera Forward Festival in Amsterdam on March 9, 2023.

Activism
Bullock integrates her musical life with community activism. She has organized benefit concerts for the Shropshire Music Foundation and International Playground, two non-profits that serve war-affected children and adolescents through music education and performance programs in Kosovo, Northern Ireland, Uganda, and St. Louis. She also participated in the Music and Medicine Benefit Concert for New York's Weill Medical Center. She also serves on the Advisory Board of Turn the Spotlight, which works to promote equity in the arts.

Accolades
 First Prize at the 2012 Young Concert Artists International Auditions
 First Prize at the 2014 Naumburg International Vocal Competition
 2015 Leonore Annenberg Arts Fellowship
 2015 Richard F. Gold Grant from the Shoshana Foundation
 Lincoln Center's 2015 Martin E. Segal Award
 2016 Sphinx Medal of Excellence

Personal life 
Bullock is married to conductor Christian Reif, with whom she has a son.  As of January 2021, she was living in Munich, Germany.

References

External links

1987 births
Living people
Eastman School of Music alumni
Bard College alumni
Juilliard School alumni
American operatic sopranos
Singers from Missouri
Musicians from St. Louis
21st-century African-American women singers
21st-century American women opera singers
African-American women opera singers
Classical musicians from Missouri